David Neil Witt (born 5 March 1971) is an Australian sailor who has competed in multiple Volvo Ocean Races.

Witt attended Newington College from 1984 until 1989.

Sailing career
Born in Sydney, Witt sailed on Innovation Kvaerner during the 1997–98 Whitbread Round the World Race.

Winner of Multiple (unspecified) World Sailing Titles 

He has appeared in over 20 Sydney to Hobart Yacht Races. He is the skipper of Scallywag, a 100 ft super maxi which he helped to design.

He is the skipper of Team Sun Hung Kai/Scallywag in the 2017–18 Volvo Ocean Race.

References

Australian male sailors (sport)
1971 births
People educated at Newington College
Volvo Ocean Race sailors
Sportsmen from New South Wales
Sailors from Sydney
Living people
20th-century Australian people